Jean Rottner (born 28 January 1967) is a French politician of the political party The Republicans who was mayor of Mulhouse from 2010 to 2017, and has been President of the regional council of Grand Est from 2017 to 2022.

Born as a son of teachers, Jean Rottner studied medicine at the University of Strasbourg.

External links
  info

1967 births
Living people
Presidents of the Regional Council of Grand Est
Regional councillors of Grand Est
Mayors of places in Grand Est
The Republicans (France) politicians
21st-century French politicians
University of Strasbourg alumni
French people of German descent
Politicians from Mulhouse